Udung-Uko is a Local Government Area of Nigeria located in the south east Akwa Ibom State that was created in December 1996.

Udung Uko is one of the Oro language speaking local government areas of Akwa Ibom State bounded by Mbo, Akwa Ibom to the south, Oron, Akwa Ibom to the north, Urue-Offong/Oruko to the west and the Cross River Estuary to the east.

History

In December 1996 Udung Uko LGA was carved out of Oron, Akwa Ibom. Esuk Usung served as the entry point for the Nigerian Army during the Nigeria Civil war of 1967 to 1970 with Biafra.

Clans and settlement
Udung Uko is made up of two (2) out of the nine (9) Oron people clans (Afaha) with the Oro language as its original language. Udung Uko has 42 organised villages which is split into 10 political wards, with capital at Eyofin. The two clans include 

Afaha Okpo Clan which includes forty (40) towns and villages;
Enino
Eyiba
Eyo Ating Osung
Eyo Esin
Eyo Esio Usung
Eyo Uliong
Eyo-Ating
Eyobiosio
Eyofin
Eyoko
Eyokponung
Eyokpu
Eyosio-Osung
Eyotai
Udung Otok
Udung Adatang
Edikor Eyiba
Edikor Eyobiosio
Edikor Eyokpu
Eniongo
Eye Oko
Eyo Atai
Eyo Atang
Eyo Ating-Osung
Eyo Ebieme
Eyo Esio Osung
Eyo Nsek
Eyo Okponung
Eyo Ukpe
Eyo Uliong
Eyo Ulung
Eyo Uwe
Eyobisung
Uboro Isong Inyang
Udung Adatang
Udung Esio
Udung Uko Town
Usung

Afaha Ubodung Clan consist of two Villages which include 
Ekim
Ubodung Udung Uko

Geography And Population
With mainly an agrarian rural population of 53,060 and a total land area of 112 km2 (excluding territorial waters).
Udung Uko is in the tropical region and has a uniformly high temperature all the year round. The two main seasons are the dry which spans between October and April and wet season which starts around May and ends in September. There are also two prevailing winds – the South-West onshore winds which brings heavy rains and the North- East trade winds blowing across the Sahara Desert, which brings in the dry season.

Economy
Udung Uko LGA has rich deposits of crude oil and salt with the area hosting a number of crude oil mining firms. Fishing is also a crucial economic enterprise in Udung Uko LGA with the area's rivers and streams being rich in seafood. Other important economic activities of the dwellers of Udung Uko LGA include farming, making of canoes and wood carving.

It has a beach market at Esuk Usung, where fishermen from Ilaje, Cameroon, Ghana, and indigenes alike who return from fishing expeditions display their wares for sale, in addition to other water ways and fronts like Esuk Okong, Esuk Edet Edem, and Atakibang from which commercial quantity of fine sand and gravels are extracted. Atakibang, so called, directly faces both the lighthouse (ibang) on the riverbed of Oron river, as well as Parrot island (Uko Ubo Akpa).

See also
 Oron people
 Urue-Offong/Oruko
 Mbo, Akwa Ibom
 Okobo, Akwa Ibom
 Oron, Akwa Ibom
 Obolo, Akwa Ibom
 Akwa Ibom State
 Oron Nation

References

Local Government Areas in Akwa Ibom State
Populated coastal places in Nigeria
Oron people
Places in Oron Nation